Viola cornuta, known as horned pansy or horned violet, is a species of flowering plant in the violet family Violaceae, native to the Pyrenees and the Cordillera Cantábrica of northern Spain at an altitude of . It is a low-growing, clump-forming temperate evergreen perennial, reaching  in height and spread. It has mid-green ovate leaves with rounded teeth, and masses of delicate pale violet flowers in early summer. The flower consists of five strap-shaped petals with a slender spur.

This plant, and the white-flowered Alba Group, have gained the Royal Horticultural Society's Award of Garden Merit.

It is a known host of the pathogenic fungus Puccinia violae.

Cultivation
Viola cornuta is hardy to USDA zones 6–11 (hardy in the UK to ). Many cultivars are hybrids with Viola × wittrockiana, designated as Viola × williamsii. Some of these, such as 'King Henry', may be hardy to zone 4.

References

Bibliography

External links

cornuta
Flora of Spain
Plants described in 1763
Taxa named by Carl Linnaeus